Selent is a municipality in the district of Plön, in Schleswig-Holstein, Germany. It is situated at the southern bank of the Selenter See.

References

Municipalities in Schleswig-Holstein
Plön (district)